The Tahu Culture was an archaeological culture in southern Taiwan. It distributed around the Tainan-Kaohsiung region. The culture was one of the late Neolithic cultures of Taiwan island. A set of several archaeological sites formed the culture, such as the Tahu Site (大湖遺址), Fengpitou Site (鳳鼻頭遺址) and Wushantou Site (烏山頭遺址). These sites had been excavated out many bone tools, potteries or middens.

See also
Niaosung Culture
List of archaeological sites in Taiwan
Prehistory of Taiwan

References

Archaeological cultures of East Asia
Neolithic cultures of Asia
Archaeological cultures in Taiwan
Tainan
Kaohsiung